The New York Olympic Athletic Club football team was an early semi-professional football team based in New York City. The team was founded by club owner, Roderick McMahon and is best remembered for playing in the 1903 World Series of Football. During the series, the Olympic A.C. defeated the Knickerbocker Athletic Club by a hard-fought score of 6-0 at Madison Square Garden.

References

Early professional American football teams in New York (state)
World Series of Football (1902–03)
Defunct American football teams in New York City
 Athletic Club football teams and seasons